Rachel Rabin (born July 28, 1983) also known by her stagename Raign (stylised as RAIGN), is an English singer-songwriter and record producer. Her songs have been featured on the soundtracks of TV series, movies and trailers including The Vampire Diaries, The 100 (TV series), The Shannara Chronicles, Legacies (TV series) and official trailers for Younger (TV Show) and Snowrunner (Video Game). Early in her career she co-wrote several singles for albums by Rita Ora, Jesse McCartney, and Tulisa, and in 2014 she was featured as a vocalist on the track "Fix Me" by Swanky Tunes. Released on Dim Mak Records, the song spent two months at No. 1 on the Russian airplay chart.

In May 2014 her first solo track as RAIGN, titled "Don't Let Me Go", debuted on episode 110 of The Vampire Diaries. She performed the song on The X Factor shortly after, which led to the song peaking at No. 11 on the official UK indie breakers chart and No.38 on UK Alternative Charts.

Raign has also had singles included on the TV series The 100, and she released her EP Knockin' on Heaven's Door in March 2015, with the lead track reaching No. 116 on the US iTunes pop charts. In 2015, the use of the EP's track "Knocking on Heaven's Door" in The 100 was voted Best Use of Music by audiences in the Entertainment Weekly TV Season Finale Awards.

In September 2018, Raign released her debut album SIGN and two preceding singles "Out of Time" and "Who Are You", which explore influences from classic rock, pop, and orchestral movements in a "culmination of creative passion". In June 2019, RAIGN announced via social media that a Deluxe Edition of Sign would be released.

Early life and education
Rachel Rabin was born in London, England, where she also spent her childhood. She attended Tolworth Girls' School in Surrey. She is of Latvian and Jewish ancestry. Her grandfather was Oscar Rabin, musician known for founding the Oscar Rabin Band. Her father also had a musical background, and had worked with Frank Sinatra. According to Rabin, she grew up listening to big band music, and "when I first decided to learn an instrument I chose a clarinet and learned to play blues and jazz. My mum was also a semi-professional opera singer and she was always singing and I used to try and emulate her." Her grandfather, who died when she was young, had been a survivor of the Holocaust.

Music career

Early songwriting and producing (2010–2013)
Working as a vocalist and songwriter, in 2009 she self-released a demo in the UK under her full name. By 2010, she was performing original music with a mix of blues, folk, and pop in the Kingston area, at venues such as the Bull's Head. She played her first show in the United States at the Viper Room in Los Angeles, where she performed a one-hour acoustic set with an accompanying guitarist. Also in the early 2010s she played festivals and venues in Leicester, and in 2011 she performed at the Mint in Los Angeles.

Early singles and debut EP (2014–2015)
In May 2014, RAIGN released her first solo single as RAIGN, titled "Don't Let Me Go",[3] which debuted on episode 110 of The Vampire Diaries.  Her second solo single as RAIGN, a cover of "Wicked Game" by Chris Isaak, was released on 7 October 2014 as an electropop number. The New York-based electronic duo Mysto & Pizzi mixed the song. At that point Mysto & Pizzi, also known for their work with Avicii and Justin Timberlake, were helping produce much of her work. In February 2015, her original track "Empire of Our Own" was included on an episode of The 100.

She released the EP Knocking on Heavens Door in March 2015, which included three of her previous tracks and the new song "Knocking on Heaven's Door." Her cover of "Knocking on Heavens Door" was included on the soundtrack of the finale to season 2 finale of The 100 in March 2015. In its first week of release the lead single reached No. 116 on the US iTunes pop charts. In 2015, the use of "Knocking on Heavens Door" in The 100 was voted Best Use of Music by audiences in the Entertainment Weekly TV Season Finale Awards.

When It's All Over EP (2016–2017) 
On 31 March 2016 Raign announced that her second EP When It's All Over would be released on 14 April 2016 and the lead single would premiere on The Vampire Diaries on 1 April.

Born Again EP (2018) 
On January 19, 2018, RAIGN announced via social media that her third EP Born Again would be released on January 26 via Millionaire London Records and would feature four new songs produced with movie soundtracks in mind, including an orchestral remake of One Thing Leads To Another, originally recorded by pop band The Fixx.

"Out of Time" (2018) 
"Out Of Time" was released on August 10, 2018 and premiered by Clash magazine. "It's about having a feeling inside that you can do something magical, but you have to move fast or the magic moment will go and if you don't do it now, you'll always regret it. Personal alchemy."

SIGN (2018-2019) and singles 
Raign's debut full-length album Sign (stylized as SIGN) was released on September 6, 2018, and two singles were released "Who Are You" and "Now I Can Fly", which premier on the TV shows Legacies and Grey's Anatomy and on the trailer for the netflix original movie Tall Girl. The album features orchestral performances, "charged vocal performances", as well as "dark, bass synth" and songs influenced by Dance music. Gig Soup described the album as "Pop romanticism". Rabin states SIGN is "a life’s work coming together." With some of the songs being written over the course of five years and describes the lyrics for this album as sometimes having "multiple meanings." RAIGN co-produced much of the record and decided to record the tracks "the old-fashioned way," recording musicians live in a studio.

SIGN deluxe edition (2020)
In June 2019, Rabin announced via social media the release of the singles "Walls" and "Now I Can Fly", stating that a Deluxe Edition of SIGN would be released later in the year.

Style and influences
Rabin has self-described the style of her material as "pop romanticism," and modern influences on her music include acts such as Florence + the Machine, Amy Winehouse, Oasis and No Doubt. Exploring this idea of pop as an arena for re-invention, and using digital pop music as a means to express magic, Rabin's fascination with the spectacular seeps into every note of her music. Rabin also cites influences from "early exposure to orchestral/film music, Blues, and Classic Rock". In her teen years, she was exposed to electronic dance music with back-beats and half-time beats. She explored the band scene in psychedelic-rock and found inspiration from artists such as Pink Floyd, their record Dark Side of the Moon, "That record rocked my world. It's poetic, cosmic, abstract and incomparable thirty years later," and also local London bands. She also experimented with grooves and tempos from Drum ‘n’ Bass and U.K. Garage styles.

Personal life
As of 2014, Rabin continued to live in both Kingston upon Thames in southwest London and Los Angeles, where her grandmother lives.

Discography

Extended plays

Albums

Singles

Guest appearances

Media Usage

Songs

See also
Rita Ora

References

External links
IamRAIGN.com
Rachel Rabin at AllMusic
Rachel Rabin at Discogs
Raign at Discogs

1983 births
Living people
English people of Latvian-Jewish descent
English people of Jewish descent
People from Surbiton
Singers from London
English women pop singers
21st-century English women singers
21st-century English singers